Wanderer is the seventh studio album by Irish folk singer Cara Dillon. It was released on 13 October 2017 on Charcoal Records.

Background
Dillon announced the album on her website and social media on 13 September 2017 by revealing the title and artwork. In an interview with the Belfast Live, she explained that she had not planned to release an album in 2017, but a period of spontaneous recording in the summer resulted in an album taking shape.

The album was recorded at Random Sound and Cooper Hall, Somerset, and predominantly features piano and acoustic guitar accompaniment by Sam Lakeman, with guest musical contributions by Justin Adams, Kris Drever, Niall Murphy, Ben Nicholls and John Smith.

The album features seven traditional ballads, two original songs and a cover version of Shaun Davey’s "Dubhdarra". Both of the album’s original songs explore the theme of emigration – historically, and in the present day – as do many of the traditional songs included.

Speaking about the inspiration for the album in a statement released by Folk Radio UK, Dillon discussed the album’s main themes of departure and longing for home, saying:

In a Belfast Telegraph interview, Dillon said that she views it as a very different album to her previous releases, saying:

Release and critical reception
The album entered the Independent Album Breakers Chart at No.1, and entered the UK Official Album Chart at No. 89.

It was well-received by critics upon release. The Guardian'''s Neil Spencer described the album with the headline "gorgeous homesick blues" and awarded the album four stars. Folking.com called the album Dillon’s "most reflective and most musically introspective album to date" and The Irish Echo'' noted a difference in tone between the album and its predecessors, saying it had "a subdued, simpler sound – one that also allows for a wider emotional range in her vocals."

Track listing

Personnel
Musicians
 Justin Adams – electric guitar
 Cara Dillon – vocals
 Sam Lakeman – producer, piano, acoustic guitar, organ
 Niall Murphy – fiddle
 Ben Nicholls – bass, double bass
 John Smith – acoustic guitar, backing vocals

Production 
 Matt Austin – photography
 Mike 'Spike' Drake – mixing
 Sam Lakeman – recording, production, mixing
 Tim Young – mastering
 Florian Zumfelde – art design and layout

References

2017 albums
Cara Dillon albums